Ahmose-Meritamon (“Born of the Moon, Beloved of Amun”) was a princess of the 17th Dynasty of Egypt, probably a daughter of pharaoh Seqenenre Tao (the Brave). She is also called Ahmose-Meritamun, Ahmose-Meryetamun or just Meryetamun.

Her mummy was found in the Deir el-Bahri cache (DB320) and is now in the Egyptian Museum in Cairo. The shroud covering her body gives her name and titles as the royal daughter, the royal sister Meritamon. Gaston Maspero had doubts about the identity of the mummy, but Grafton Elliot Smith points out in his description of the royal mummies that the method of mummification is consistent with that of the 18th Dynasty. The remains are those of an old woman who was relatively short in stature. The examination of her mummy shows that she suffered a head wound prior to her death which has the characteristics of wound sustained when falling backwards. The body was badly damaged by tomb robbers.

She is not to be confused with her niece Ahmose-Meritamon, who became the wife of Amenhotep I.

References

External Links
 https://www.nationalgeographic.com/science/article/110415-ancient-egypt-mummies-princess-heart-disease-health-science Princess with a hearth disease

16th-century BC women
Princesses of the Seventeenth Dynasty of Egypt
Ancient Egyptian mummies